Die Sekte is the self-titled album by Berlin-based rap group Die Sekte.

Background

After the closure of hip hop label Aggro Berlin, Sido got signed to Universal, where he produced and released his fourth album Aggro Berlin. The album contains a song "10 Jahre", which features the members of Die Sekte, and soon the recordings and productions for their album began.

Track list
 "Hier gehts um Rap" ("It's about rap") - 2:47
 "Wer ist da" ("Who's here?") - 3:49
 "Rockstarz" -3:33
 "Kriegstrommel" ("War drum") - 3:36
 "Fresse halten" ("Shut up") - 4:01
 "Ding dong" -5:03
 "Friedhof" ("Graveyard") - 3:25
 "Jetzt is aus" ("It's over") - 4:19
 "Echte Männer" ("Real men") - 3:45
 "Rums im Gesicht" ("Poww in ya face") - 4:19
 "Wir chilln" ("We're chillin'") - 4:43
 "Alte Schule" ("Old school") - 3:00
 "Mittelfinga ab" ("Cutting off the middle finger") - 3:27
 "Geht in Deckung" ("Take cover") - 4:13
 "Sekte Gang" ("Sect gang") - 3:33
 "Mörderrap 2" ("Murder rap 2")

References

2009 albums
Die Sekte albums
German-language albums